Pr0211 b (also written Pr 0211 b) is a gas giant exoplanet orbiting around the Sun-like star Pr0211 (2MASS J08421149+1916373), a G-type main sequence star. Pr0211 b along with Pr0201 b are notable for being the first exoplanets discovered in the Beehive cluster located in the constellation Cancer. Its host star, Pr0211, is rotationally variable and has a rotation period of 7.97 days.

Discovery
Pr0211 b and Pr0201 b were discovered in 2012 by Sam Quinn and his colleagues while observing 53 stars in the Beehive cluster using the  telescope at the University of Georgia in the United States. Another planet (Pr0211 c) in the same star system was discovered in 2016.

References

Exoplanets discovered in 2012
Exoplanets detected by radial velocity
Cancer (constellation)
Hot Jupiters